Yakov Godorozha (: Yakiv Semenovych Hodorozha; born 18 May 1993) is a Ukrainian former competitive figure skater. He is a two-time Ukrainian national champion (2013, 2014). He began learning to skate under the guidance of Georgi Starkov at the Ldinka rink in Odessa, and later trained in Dnipropetrovsk and Kyiv, where he was coached by Marina Amirkhanova. At the 2013 Nebelhorn Trophy, Godorozha earned a spot for Ukraine in the men's event at the 2014 Winter Olympics. He finished 20th in Sochi. He retired from competition in August 2014.

Programs

Competitive highlights 
JGP: Junior Grand Prix

References

External links 

 

1993 births
Ukrainian male single skaters
Living people
Sportspeople from Odesa
Olympic figure skaters of Ukraine
Figure skaters at the 2014 Winter Olympics